Park Eun-ji (born July 8, 1993), better known by her stage name Han So-eun (Korean: 한소은), is a South Korean actress. She is best known for her role as young Jung Da-jung in 18 Again and Jang Stella in Idol: The Coup.

Filmography

Films

Television series

Web series

References

External links

 Han So-eun at Starit Entertainment

1993 births
Living people
People from Daegu
Dongduk Women's University alumni
South Korean web series actresses
South Korean television actresses
21st-century South Korean actresses